Thiyam Chingkheinganba (born 21 March 1996) is an Indian former professional footballer.

Career
Chingkheinganba started his career with the Tata Football Academy before graduating in 2015. From Tata, he moved to Mumbai of the I-League. He made his professional debut for the club on 13 March 2016 against reigning league champions, Mohun Bagan. He started the match and played 42 minutes as Mumbai lost 2–0.

For the 2017–18 I-League 2nd Division season, Thiyam joined TRAU.

Career statistics

References

External links 
 Tata Football Academy Profile.

1996 births
Living people
Indian footballers
Mumbai FC players
TRAU FC players
Association football midfielders
Footballers from Manipur
I-League players
I-League 2nd Division players